The National Revolutionary Army (NRA), sometimes shortened to Revolutionary Army before 1928, and as National Army after 1928, was the military arm of the Kuomintang (KMT, or the Chinese Nationalist Party) from 1925 until 1947 in China. It also became the regular army of the Republican era during the KMT's period of party rule beginning in 1928. It was renamed the Republic of China Armed Forces after the 1947 Constitution, which instituted civilian control of the military.

Originally organized with Soviet aid as a means for the KMT to unify China during the Warlord Era, the National Revolutionary Army fought major engagements in the Northern Expedition against the Chinese Beiyang Army warlords, in the Second Sino-Japanese War (1937–1945) against the Imperial Japanese Army and in the Chinese Civil War against the People's Liberation Army.

During the Second Sino-Japanese War, the armed forces of the Chinese Communist Party were nominally incorporated into the National Revolutionary Army (while retaining separate commands), but broke away to form the People's Liberation Army shortly after the end of the war. With the promulgation of the Constitution of the Republic of China in 1947 and the formal end of the KMT party-state, the National Revolutionary Army was renamed the Republic of China Armed Forces, with the bulk of its forces forming the Republic of China Army, which retreated to the island of Taiwan in 1949.

History

The NRA was founded by the KMT in 1925 as the military force destined to unite China in the Northern Expedition. Organized with the help of the Comintern and guided under the doctrine of the Three Principles of the People, the distinction among party, state and army was often blurred. A large number of the Army's officers passed through the Whampoa Military Academy, and the first commandant, Chiang Kai-shek, became commander-in-chief of the Army in 1925 before launching the successful Northern Expedition. Other prominent commanders included Du Yuming and Chen Cheng. The end of the Northern Expedition in 1928 is often taken as the date when China's Warlord era ended, though smaller-scale warlord activity continued for years afterwards.

In 1927, after the dissolution of the First United Front between the Nationalists and the Communists, the ruling KMT purged its leftist members and largely eliminated Soviet influence from its ranks. Chiang Kai-shek then turned to Germany, historically a great military power, for the reorganization and modernization of the National Revolutionary Army. The Weimar Republic sent advisers to China, but because of the restrictions imposed by the Treaty of Versailles they could not serve in military capacities. Chiang initially requested famous generals such as Ludendorff and von Mackensen as advisers; the Weimar Republic government turned him down, however, fearing that they were too famous, would invite the ire of the Allies and that it would result in the loss of national prestige for such renowned figures to work, essentially, as mercenaries.

When Adolf Hitler became Germany's chancellor in 1933 and disavowed the Treaty, the anti-communist Nazi Party and the anti-communist KMT were soon engaged in close cooperation. with Germany training Chinese troops and expanding Chinese infrastructure, while China opened its markets and natural resources to Germany. Max Bauer was the first adviser to China.

In 1934, Gen. Hans von Seeckt, acting as adviser to Chiang, proposed an "80 Division Plan" for reforming the entire Chinese army into 80 divisions of highly trained, well-equipped troops organised along German lines. The plan was never fully realised, as the eternally bickering warlords could not agree upon which divisions were to be merged and disbanded. Furthermore, since embezzlement and fraud were commonplace, especially in understrength divisions (the state of most of the divisions), reforming the military structure would threaten divisional commanders' "take". Therefore, by July 1937 only eight infantry divisions had completed reorganization and training. These were the 3rd, 6th, 9th, 14th, 36th, 87th, 88th, and the Training Division.

Another German general, Alexander von Falkenhausen, came to China in 1934 to help reform the army. However, because of Nazi Germany's later cooperation with the Empire of Japan, he was later recalled in 1937. After his goodbye party with Chiang Kai-shek's family, he promised not to reveal his devised battle plans to the Japanese.

For a time, during the Second Sino-Japanese War, Communist forces fought as a nominal part of the National Revolutionary Army, forming the Eighth Route Army and the New Fourth Army units, but this co-operation later fell apart. Throughout the Chinese Civil War the National Revolutionary Army experienced major problems with desertion, with many soldiers switching sides to fight for the Communists. Women were also part of the army's corps during the war. In 1937 Soong Mei-ling encouraged women to support the Sino-Japanese War effort, by forming battalions, such as the Guangxi Women's Battalion.

Troops in India and Burma during World War II included the Chinese Expeditionary Force (Burma), the Chinese Army in India and Y Force.

The US government repeatedly threatened to cut off aid to China during World War 2 unless they handed over total command of all Chinese military forces to the US. After considerable stalling, the arrangement only fell through due to a particularly insulting letter from the Americans to Chiang. By the end of the war, US influence over the political, economic, and military affairs of China were greater than any foreign power in the last century, with American personnel appointed in every field, such as the Chief of Staff of the Chinese military, management of the Chinese War Production Board and Board of Transport, trainers of the secret police, and Chiang's personal advisor. Sir George Sansom, British envoy to the US, reported that many US military officers saw US monopoly on Far Eastern trade as a rightful reward for fighting the Pacific war.

After the drafting and implementation of the Constitution of the Republic of China in 1947, the National Revolutionary Army was transformed into the ground service branch of the Republic of China Armed Forces – the Republic of China Army (ROCA).

Structure

The NRA throughout its lifespan recruited approximately 4,300,000 regulars, in 370 Standard Divisions (正式師), 46 New Divisions (新編師), 12 Cavalry Divisions (騎兵師), eight New Cavalry Divisions (新編騎兵師), 66 Temporary Divisions (暫編師), and 13 Reserve Divisions (預備師), for a grand total of 515 divisions. However, many divisions were formed from two or more other divisions, and were not active at the same time.

At the apex of the NRA was the National Military Council, also translated as Military Affairs Commission. Chaired by Chiang Kai-Shek, it directed the staffs and commands. It included from 1937 the Chief of the General Staff, General He Yingqin, the General Staff, the War Ministry, the military regions, air and naval forces, air defence and garrison commanders, and support services Around 14 Million were conscripted from 1937 to 1945.

Also, New Divisions were created to replace Standard Divisions lost early in the war and were issued the old division's number. Therefore, the number of divisions in active service at any given time is much smaller than this. The average NRA division had 5,000–6,000 troops; an average army division had 10,000–15,000 troops, the equivalent of a Japanese division. Not even the German-trained divisions were on par in terms of manpower with a German or Japanese division, having only 10,000 men.

The United States Army's campaign brochure on the China Defensive campaign of 1942–45 said:
The NRA only had small number of armoured vehicles and mechanised troops. At the beginning of the war in 1937 the armour were organized in three Armoured Battalions, equipped with tanks and armoured cars from various countries. After these battalions were mostly destroyed in the Battle of Shanghai and Battle of Nanjing. The newly provided tanks, armoured cars, and trucks from the Soviet Union and Italy made it possible to create the only mechanized division in the army, the 200th Division. This Division eventually ceased to be a mechanized unit after the June 1938 reorganization of Divisions. The armoured and artillery Regiments were placed under direct command of 5th Corps and the 200th Division became a motorized Infantry Division within the same Corps. This Corps fought battles in Guangxi in 1939–1940 and in the Battle of Yunnan-Burma Road in 1942 reducing the armoured units due to losses and mechanical breakdown of the vehicles. On paper China had 3.8 million men under arms in 1941. They were organized into 246 "front-line" divisions, with another 70 divisions assigned to rear areas. Perhaps as many as forty Chinese divisions had been equipped with European-manufactured weapons and trained by foreign, particularly German and Soviet, advisers. The rest of the units were under strength and generally untrained. Overall, the Nationalist Army impressed most Western military observers as more reminiscent of a 19th- than a 20th-century army.
Late in the Burma Campaign the NRA Army there had an armoured battalion equipped with Sherman tanks.

Despite the poor reviews given by European observers to the European-trained Divisions, the Muslim Divisions of the National Revolutionary Army, trained in China (not by Westerners) and led by Ma Clique Muslim generals, frightened the European observers with their appearance and fighting skills in battle. Europeans like Sven Hedin and Georg Vasel were in awe of the appearance Chinese Muslim NRA divisions made and their ferocious combat abilities. They were trained in harsh, brutal conditions. The 36th Division (National Revolutionary Army), trained entirely in China without any European help, was composed of Chinese Muslims and fought and severely mauled an invading Soviet Russian army during the Soviet Invasion of Xinjiang. The division was lacking in technology and manpower, but badly damaged the superior Russian force.

The Muslim divisions of the army controlled by Muslim Gen. Ma Hongkui were reported by Western observers to be tough and disciplined.  Despite having diabetes Ma Hongkui personally drilled with his troops and engaged in sword fencing during training.

When the leaders of many of the warlord and provincial armies joined with the KMT and were appointed as officers and generals, their troops joined the NRA. These armies were renamed as NRA divisions. The entire Ma Clique armies were absorbed into the NRA. When the Muslim Ma Clique General Ma Qi joined the KMT, the Ninghai Army was renamed the National Revolutionary Army 26th Division.

Unit organization

The unit organisation of the NRA is as follows: (Note that a unit is not necessarily subordinate to one immediately above it; several army regiments can be found under an army group, for example.)
The commander-in-chief of the NRA from 1925 to 1947 was Generalissimo Chiang Kai-shek.

Military Affairs Commission
Military Region ×12 (戰區)
Army Corps ×4(兵團) – the Army Corps, 兵團, was one of the largest military formations in the NRA during the Second Sino-Japanese War. These Army Corps were composed of a number of Group Armies, Army, Corps, Divisions, Brigades and Regiments. In numbers of divisions, they were larger than Western Army groups. Only four were ever formed to command the large forces defending the Chinese capital during the Battle of Wuhan in 1938. (See Order of battle of Battle of Wuhan).
Army Group ×40 (集團軍 )
Route Army (路軍)
Field army ×30 (軍)
Corps ×133 (軍團 ) – usually exercised command over two to three NRA Divisions and often a number of Independent Brigades or Regiments and supporting units. The Chinese Republic had 133 Corps during the Second Sino-Japanese War. After losses in the early part of the war, under the 1938 reforms, the remaining scarce artillery and the other support formations were withdrawn from the Division and was held at Corps, or Army level or higher. The Corps became the basic tactical unit of the NRA having strength nearly equivalent to an allied Division.
Division (師)
Brigade (旅)
Regiment (團)
Battalion (營)
Company (連)
Platoon (排)
Squad (班)

Divisional Organisation 
The NRA used multiple divisional organisations as different threats emerged as well as other factors necessitated a new organisation. The Years below relate to the Minguo calendar which starts in 1911. Therefore, the 22nd year division is the 1933 division.

22nd Year Anti-communist division 

 Divisional HQ 79 officers 147 enlisted
 Signal company 6 officers 168 enlisted (subdivided into 3 platoons with 3 squads per platoon) 
 Reconnaissance Company 5 officers 144 enlisted 
 3 infantry regiments each containing:
 Regimental HQ 22 officers 68 enlisted 
 Signal Platoon 1 officer 48 enlisted
 3 infantry battalions each containing:
 Battalion HQ 4 officers 13 enlisted
 3 rifle companies 6 officers 145 enlisted (divided into 3 platoons with each platoon having 3 14 man squads)
 Machine gun company 5 officers 121 enlisted (divided into 3 platoons each with 2 16 man squads with Maxim MGs)
 Mortar Company 6 officers 138 enlisted (divded into 3 platoons each with 2 19 man squads with 82mm mortars)
 Special Service Company 6 officers 145 enlisted (indendtical to rifle company)
 Transport platoon 1 officer 42 enlisted (3 14 man squads)
 Stretcher-bearer Platoon 1 officer 43 enlisted (3 13 man squads)
 Artillery Battalion
 Battalion HQ 12 officers 98 enlisted
 Three batteries each containing 5 officers 203 enlisted (2 platoons each with 2 75mm guns)
 Engineer Battalion
 Battalion HQ 11 officers 41 enlisted
 Three engineer companies each 6 officers 179 enlisted (3 platoons each with 3 17 man squads)
 Special service Battalion 27 officers 569 enlisted (identical to infantry battalion)
 Transport Battalion
 Battalion HQ 13 officers 31 enlisted
 Two Transport Companies each 6 officers 148 enlisted (3 platoons each with 3 14 man squads)

The above template was only applied to divisions serving in Guangxi during the 5th encirclement campaign.

60 Division Plan 
A new Plan was devised in 1935 to raise 60 new divisions in 6 month batches with divisions to be raised from divisional districts tied to them, in an aim to enhance cohesion and communication as well as simplifying recruitment, officers however were to be recruited nationally and placed into these divisions to disrupt regional affiliations. The 24th Year New Type division was almost the equivalent of western style divisions with the notable difference being the absence of radios in the Chinese division. Planning began in December 1934 and in January 1935 a classified meeting of over 80 of the highest NRA officers was called with a timetable published.

 6-10 divisions were to be organised in 1935
 16-20 divisions in 1936
 20-30 divisions in 1937
 The remainder in 1938.

This new army being significantly better armed and trained than the warlord armies would give Chiang a large advantage over his domestic opponents as well as being personally answerable to the Generalissimo.

However, Chinese industry was incapable of producing the artillery or infantry guns in large quantities needed for the 60 division plan and German imports were not forthcoming. Mortars were introduced as substitutes for the infantry guns and later as a substitute for artillery. Horses were also lacking as the new division required many of them and Chinese divisions often used mules oxen or even buffalos as substitutes for the many horses.

10 divisions were organised in 1935 on the new model but equipment was lacking. A further 20 were reorganised by the Marco Polo Bridge Incident but equipment was again lacking meaning these divisions were not to be the modern equivalent of Western style or Japanese divisions.

24th Year New Type Division 

 Division HQ 138 men 33 horses
 Cavalry Squadron 237 men 239 horses
 Signal Battalion (372 men and 129 horses) 
 Battalion HQ 36 horses 129 horses
 Two Signal companies each with 131 men
 Trains 74 men
 Two Infantry Brigades Each (6,114 men and 1,216 horses)
 Brigade HQ 29 men 10 horses
 Two Infantry Regiments each with
 Regiment HQ 51 men 10 horses
 Signal company 91 men 17 horses
 Three Infantry Battalions each with
 Battalion HQ 47 men 3 horses
 Three rifle companies each with 177 men 
 Machine Gun company 126 men 43 horses
 Gun platoon 71 men 26 horses
 Infantry Gun/Mortar Company 118 men 56 horses
 Special Duty Platoon 53 men
 Special Duty Platoon 53 men
 Field Artillery Regiment (2,045 men and 1,181 horses)
 Regiment HQ 72 men 31 horses
 Signal Battery 237 men 106 horses
 Three Field Artillery Battalions each with
 Battalion HQ 66 men 348 horses 
 Three Batteries each with 165 men
 Special Duty Platoon 53 men
 OR Mountain Artillery Regiment (in substitute of a Field Artillery Regiment) (2,565 men and 1,163)
 Regiment HQ 72 men 31 horses
 Singal Battery 237 men 106 horses
 Three Mountain Artillery Battalions each with
 Battalion HQ 66 men 342 horses
 Three Batteries each with 211 men
 Special Duty Platoon 53 men
 Engineer Battalion (622 men and 89 horses) 
 Battalion HQ 33 men 89 horses
 Signal Platoon 37 men
 Three Engineer Companies each with 184 men
 Transport Battalion (332 men and 332 horses) 
 Battalion HQ 37 men 6 horses
 1st Transport Company 188 men 221 horses
 2nd Transport Company 107 men 105 horses 
 Special Duty Company 234 men
 Other 155 men

For a total of 10,012 men and 3,219 horses with the field artillery regiment. With the Mountain artillery regiment the total is 10,632 men and 3,237 horses

Wartime adjustments 

However, as the war progressed and masses of equipment was lost the 60 division plan was abandoned as were larger divisions in general as the Military Affairs Commission switched to a smaller more mobile division suited to the reality of the situation. This was after an initial reorganisation in 1937 which incorporated the type 89 grenade launcher which impressed the Chinese. It must be noted, however, that even though this 1937 reorganisation maintained division strength at slightly under 11,000 men, less than 4,000 (the frontline personnel) were issued small arms such as rifles. In 1938 a further reform was brought about by He Yingqin at the behest of Chiang Kai-shek. He's report called for an integrated numbering and designation of units from the regimental level up and a standardised financial and supply system and the appointment of loyal commanders. A new division table was also organised: the 27th Year (1938) division, which created the field army as a fixed unit, abolished divisional artillery (often a paper force due to the chronic shortage of field artillery) and coordinated artillery support at the army level; although the division remained at roughly 11,000 men strong this template was not followed with few divisions being re-organised on this pattern due to the constant campaigning of the Central Army and the refusal of the warlords to adopt the new organisation. Nonetheless, the division still proved too large and they were reformed into triangular divisions (a division with a divisional HQ and 3 infantry regiments rather than the previous square division with 2 brigades each with 2 regiments); this 1938 organisation remained the most common formation until the end of the war although it was modified with 16 divisions receiving Anti-tank companies and 20 receiving anti-aircraft companies. Artillery remained in a chronic shortage only partially remedied by the production of 82mm mortars, but these mortars were far from universal even by the end of the war. Further changes were made in the 1942 re-organisation with the 1938 division losing all of its non-combat formations. These formations were moved to the field army level, and with the universal adoption of the triangular division formation the 1942 division had a strength of 6,794 officers and enlisted 60% of the strength of the 1938 division.

Dare to Die Corps
During the Xinhai Revolution and the Warlord Era of the Republic of China, "Dare to Die Corps" were frequently used by Chinese armies. China deployed these suicide units against the Japanese during the Second Sino-Japanese War.

"Dare to Die" troops were used by warlords in their armies to conduct suicide attacks. "Dare to Die" corps continued to be used in the Chinese military. The Kuomintang used one to put down an insurrection in Canton. Many women joined them in addition to men to achieve martyrdom against China's opponents.

A "dare to die corps" was effectively used against Japanese units at the Battle of Taierzhuang. They used swords.

Suicide bombing was also used against the Japanese. A Chinese soldier detonated a grenade vest and killed 20 Japanese soldiers at Sihang Warehouse. Chinese troops strapped explosives like grenade packs or dynamite to their bodies and threw themselves under Japanese tanks to blow them up. This tactic was used during the Battle of Shanghai, where a Chinese suicide bomber stopped a Japanese tank column by exploding himself beneath the lead tank, and at the Battle of Taierzhuang where dynamite and grenades were strapped on by Chinese troops who rushed at Japanese tanks and blew themselves up. In one incident at Taierzhuang, Chinese suicide bombers obliterated four Japanese tanks with grenade bundles.

Penal Battalions
During the Chinese Civil War the National Revolutionary Army (NRA) was known to have used penal battalions from 1945 to 1949. A unit made up of deserters and those accused of cowardice, the penal battalion was giving such tasks as scouting ahead of the main forces to check for ambushes, crossing rivers and torrents to see whether they were fordable, and walking across unmapped minefields.

Conscription

The military was formed through bloody and inhumane conscription campaigns. These are described by Rudolph Rummel as:This was a deadly affair in which men were kidnapped for the army, rounded up indiscriminately by press-gangs or army units among those on the roads or in the towns and villages, or otherwise gathered together. Many men, some the very young and old, were killed resisting or trying to escape. Once collected, they would be roped or chained together and marched, with little food or water, long distances to camp. They often died or were killed along the way, sometimes less than 50 percent reaching camp alive. Then recruit camp was no better, with hospitals resembling Nazi concentration camps like Buchenwald.

Officers

Other ranks

Strength and Distribution Early 1937 

(Former Northeastern army troops are included in the Central Government Column given the arrest of Zhang Xueliang following the Xi'an incident)

The above categorisations are not the sole indicator of loyalty it is how they were categorised at the time.

Arsenals of the NRA 
These arsenals listed below are those established before the beginning of the 2nd Sino-Japanese War.

Gongxian Arsenal 
Established in 1915 in Henan. The Central Government took over the arsenal in 1930 and full production resumed in 1931. Employing 2,400 workers it was producing 1,800 rifles, 12 Maxim guns and 20,000 grenades each month. In 1934 production of rifles had risen to 3,200 per month.

Jiangnan Arsenal 
Established in 1865 in Shanghai. The arsenal was captured by the Central Government in 1927. Its production in 1931 was 8 75mm mountain guns, 31 Type Triple-Ten machine guns, three million cartridges and 600lbs of smokeless powder each month. However, following the demilitarization of Shanghai following the 1932 battle, the arsenal became dormant with its light machinery moved to other arsenals whilst the heavy machinery remained until 1937.

Hanyang Arsenal 
First began production in 1895 in Hubei, it was captured by the Central government in 1926. Between 1895 to 1938 the arsenal produced 876,316 Type 88 rifles. In 1934 the arsenal also produced 240 Type Triple-Ten machine guns and 4 75mm field guns.

Taiyuan Arsenal 
Established in 1898 in Shanxi, the arsenal was expanded by Yan Xishan. Production in 1930 was 500 pistols, 1,500 rifles, 50 machine guns, 300 mortars a month as well as a theoretical 30 mountain guns a month though none were in actual production. The arsenal however deteriorated and by 1937, the Central Government took the machinery and used it for other arsenals.

Jinling Arsenal 
Established in 1865 in Nanjing, the Central Government captured the arsenal in 1927. In 1936 after investment from the government, the arsenal was producing 610 machine guns, 3,600,000 cartridges, 480 mortars, 204,000 mortar shells and 34,000 gas masks annually.

Guangdong Arsenal 
Established in 1874, in 1917 production was 600 rifles, 500,000 cartridges and 6 machine guns. However the production quality of the arsenal deteriorated and following a 1935 inspection only 10% of the cartridges were found to have passed inspection. The arsenal came under the control of the Central Government following the defection of Yu Hanmou to Nanjing during the Liangguang incident.

Sichuan Arsenal/Chongqing Arms Depot 
Established in 1878, the arsenals production in 1913 was 15,000 rifles, 7,500,000 cartridges, 45,000lbs of smokeless powder annually. However due to warfare in Sichuan the arsenal was closed, then finally moved to Chongqing in 1932. In 1933 it produced 6,000 KE7 machine guns.

Jinan Arsenal 
Located in Shandong. By the mid 1930s this arsenal was producing 3,000,000 cartridges and 60,000 grenades every month.

Equipment 

For regular provincial Chinese divisions the standard rifles were the Hanyang 88 (copy of Gewehr 88). Central army divisions were typically equipped with the Chiang Kai-shek rifle and other Mauser type rifles from Germany, Belgium and Czechoslovakia. The standard light machine gun were imported or domestically produced of the Czech Brno ZB vz. 26 in the standard 7.92 mm. There were machine guns from other sources, such as Belgian, French and from the Soviet Aid Programme. In general, there were 6-9 LMG's in an infantry company, with  the monthly ammunition supply being around 5,000 rounds (for 5 days consumption). Heavy machine guns were mainly locally-made Type 24 water-cooled Maxim guns (which were based on the commercial version of the German MG08), and Type Triple-Ten M1917 Browning machine guns chambered for the standard 8mm Mauser round. On average, every Central Army battalion contained a machine gun company with 5-6 heavy machine guns. They were allotted a monthly supply of 20,000 rounds. The most common sidearm for NCOs and officers was the 7.63 mm Mauser C96 semi-automatic pistol. Submachine guns were not part of any TO&E, but many were inherited from former warlord armies or locally produced. They were generally carried by the guards of divisional or corps commanders or special service platoon/companies. Some elite units, such as the X Force in Burma used Lend-Lease US equipment.

Generally speaking, the regular provincial army divisions did not possess any artillery. However, some Central Army divisions were equipped with 37 mm PaK 35/36 anti-tank guns, and/or mortars from Oerlikon, Madsen, and Solothurn. Each of these infantry divisions ideally had 6 French Brandt 81 mm mortars and 6 Solothurn 20 mm autocannons. Some independent brigades and artillery regiments were equipped with Krupp 75 mm L/29 field guns, Krupp 75 mm L/14, or Bofors 75 mm L/20 mountain guns.  There were also 24 Rheinmetall 150 mm L/32 sFH 18 howitzers (bought in 1934) and 24 Krupp 150 mm L/30 sFH 18 howitzers (bought in 1936). At the start of the war, the NRA and the Tax Police Regiment had three tank battalions armed with German Panzer I light tanks and CV-35 tankettes. After defeat in the Battle of Shanghai the remaining tanks, together with several hundred T-26 and BT-5 tanks acquired from the Soviet Union were reorganised into the 200th Division.

Infantry uniforms were basically redesigned Zhongshan suits. Puttees were standard for soldiers and officers alike, since the primary mode of movement for NRA troops was by foot. Troops were also issued sewn field caps. The helmets were the most distinguishing characteristic of these divisions. From the moment German M35 Stahlhelms rolled off the production lines in 1935, and until 1936, the NRA imported 315,000 of these helmets, usually seen with the Blue Sky with a White Sun emblem of the ROC on the sides. These helmets were worn by both the German-trained divisions and regular Central Army divisions. Other helmets included the French Adrian helmet, the British Brodie helmet and later the American M1 helmet. Other equipment included straw shoes for soldiers (cloth shoes for Central Army), leather shoes for officers and leather boots for high-ranking officers. Every soldier was issued ammunition for his weapon, along with ammunition pouches or harness, a water flask, bayonet, food bag, and a gas mask.

See also

Whampoa Military Academy
List of German-trained divisions of the National Revolutionary Army
Sino-German cooperation until 1941
Military history of the Republic of China
Douglas MacArthur

References

Citations

Sources

Further reading
 Dreyer, Edward L. (1995) China at War 1901–1949 (reprint Routledge, 2014)
 Jowett, Philip. (2013) China's Wars: Rousing the Dragon 1894–1949 (Bloomsbury Publishing, 2013).
 Li, Xiaobing. (2012) China at War: An Encyclopedia excerpt
Lynch, Dr Michael, The Chinese Civil War 1945–49: Modern Warfare (Guide To... Book 61) Osprey Publishing (2010),

External links
ROC Ministry of National Defense Official Website
The Armed Forces Museum of ROC
Information and pictures of Nationalist Revolutionary Army weapons and equipment
rare pictures of NRA heavy armoury
more pictures of NRA

 
Military of the Republic of China
Kuomintang
Military history of the Republic of China (1912–1949)
Military wings of nationalist parties
Military units and formations established in 1925
1925 establishments in China
1920s in China
1930s in China
1940s in China